F90 or F-90 may refer to:

Science and technology
 Alacrite, a cobalt-based alloy also known as F90
 Beechcraft King Air F90, a twin engine turboprop airplane
BMW M5 (F90), a 6th generation of high performance variant of the BMW 5 Series
 Fortran 90, a computer programming language
Hyperkinetic disorder (ICD-10 code)
 Nikon F90, a 35mm SLR camera

Military
 Lockheed XF-90
 F90 assault rifle, an assault rifle by Thales Australia, a development of the Steyr AUG assault rifle

Other uses
 F-90 (comics), a fictional likeness of the Lockheed XF-90